This is a comprehensive list of songs by French-Canadian singer-songwriter Mylène Farmer, in alphabetical order. It contains only songs that were officially released from 1984, whatever they were recorded in studio or live version. Songs are listed as having been released only on the first format on which they featured, whatever it was an album or a single (when they appeared as B-sides of another song). As of 2015, the singer has recorded a total of 138 songs, including two instrumentals, eight covers, eight duets, three English versions of songs previously recorded in French, five B-sides, two hidden tracks and two soundtracks.

See also
 Mylène Farmer discography

Notes and references
 
 

Farmer, Mylene
Farmer, Mylene